Wolvesnewton is a small village in Monmouthshire, Wales.

Location
It lies in the traditional Upper Division of the Hundred of Raglan.

Etymology
The village and civil parish took their English name from the family of Lupus (Wolf) or Lovel, who were lords of the manor in the 13th and 14th century.

The official Welsh name, Llanwynell, also found on many maps, is derived from the name of the reputed Saint Gwynell, noted by Lewys Dynn as "Syr Vwniel L. of(f) Wolffs Newton() Knight. He accepted the Christian Faith año 188, and erected a church at his own expense." In a list of Welsh parishes circa 1556, and in other later lists, Gwynell is given the parish of Llanwynell or Llanwnell.

History 
In the 13th and 14th centuries, the area was held as a manor by the Lupus / Wolff / Lovel family, with their manor house at Cwrt-y-gaer. According to family tradition, they originated in Thuringia and came to the area with the Romans. The village is located to the north of Wentwood, which in Norman times covered a larger area than today.

Church of St Thomas à Becket

The parish church is dedicated to St Thomas à Becket who had been killed in 1170 and was canonised three years later.  The church largely dates from the 13th century but was substantially restored in 1855–57. It has a 16th-century "saddle-back" roof, and three bells. The north side of the churchyard is locally called the "devil's side" and has no graves. The war memorial in the churchyard incorporates part of a large mediaeval stone cross.

Gaer Fawr hill fort
That second Welsh name, "Trenewydd Dan-y-Gaer, means "new town under the fort".

Model Farm and Craft Museum
From the 1970s to 1996 the village was the home of the Model Farm Folk Museum and Craft Centre. This was arranged around an actual model farm built for the Duke of Beaufort, with a farmhouse, roundhouse and mill.  It was built in 1780, but not fully mapped until after 1841. It was sold by the Beauforts to the then owners of a major local house, Tredean, in 1900, and later sold on to the owner of another major local property, Itton Court. After the museum closure, it was converted into housing.

References

External links 
 Photos of Wolvesnewton and surrounding area on geograph
 

Villages in Monmouthshire